All Ceylon Islamic United Front was a political party in Sri Lanka. ACIUF was founded in 1960 by M. S. Kariapper. ACIUF contested the July 1960 legislative election, but it won no seats. The party was later disbanded.

1960 establishments in Ceylon
Defunct political parties in Sri Lanka
Islamic political parties in Sri Lanka
Political parties established in 1960
Political parties in Sri Lanka